Edward Lawrence Turchin (February 10, 1917 – February 8, 1982) was an American professional baseball infielder. He played one season in Major League Baseball (MLB) with the Cleveland Indians.

Biography
Turchin, nicknamed "Smiley", had a minor league baseball career spanning 1937 to 1946, with gaps, as he did not play professionally during 1938, 1944, or 1945. He was one of many players who only appeared in the major leagues during World War II, appearing in 11 games for the 1943 Cleveland Indians, spending time as a third baseman and shortstop. With the Indians, he batted 3-for-13 (.231) with one RBI.

Turchin was born in New York City, and served in the United States Navy during World War II. He was Jewish, and attended Brooklyn College. He died in 1982, two days before his 65th birthday, in Brookhaven, New York.

References

External links

1917 births
1982 deaths
Major League Baseball infielders
United States Navy personnel of World War II
Cleveland Indians players
Dominion Hawks players
Batavia Clippers players
Rome Colonels players
Hutchinson Pirates players
Wilkes-Barre Barons players
Indianapolis Indians players
Brooklyn College alumni
Baseball players from New York (state)
Jewish American baseball players
Jewish Major League Baseball players
20th-century American Jews